The 2011 Men's European Volleyball Championship was the 27th edition of the European Volleyball Championship, organised by Europe's governing volleyball body, the CEV. It was held in Austria and Czech Republic from 10 to 18 September 2011.

Host selection
Candidates for the 2011 Men's European Volleyball Championship

 /  (Winner)
 /

Qualification
Hosts

Top 5 teams of the 2009 edition directly qualified.

Qualified through the qualification.

Squads

Pools composition

Venues

Pool standing procedure
 Match points
 Number of matches won
 Sets ratio
 Points ratio
 Result of the last match between the tied teams

Match won 3–0 or 3–1: 3 match points for the winner, 0 match points for the loser
Match won 3–2: 2 match points for the winner, 1 match point for the loser

Preliminary round
All times are Central European Summer Time (UTC+02:00).

Pool A

|}

|}

Pool B

|}

|}

Pool C

|}

|}

Pool D

|}

|}

Final round
All times are Central European Summer Time (UTC+02:00).

Playoffs

|}

Quarterfinals

|}

Semifinals

|}

3rd place match

|}

Final

|}

Final standing

Awards

Most Valuable Player
  Ivan Miljković
Best Scorer
  Maxim Mikhaylov
Best Spiker
  Maxim Mikhaylov
Best Blocker
  Marko Podraščanin

Best Server
  Bartosz Kurek
Best Setter
  Dragan Travica
Best Receiver
  Nikola Kovačević
Best Libero
  Andrea Bari

See also
2011 Women's European Volleyball Championship

External links
Official website
Organizer website 

2011
European Championship,Men
International volleyball competitions hosted by Austria
International volleyball competitions hosted by the Czech Republic
2011 in Czech sport
2011 in Austrian sport
September 2011 sports events in Europe